Józef Kowalski may refer to:

 Józef Kowalski (priest) (1911–1942), Polish Roman Catholic priest killed at Auschwitz, beatified
 Józef Kowalski (supercentenarian) (1900–2013), Polish uhlan, second-to-last surviving veteran of the Polish-Soviet War